Sagitta (AK-87) was never commissioned and thus never bore the USS designation.

The ship, contracted as the Maritime Commission MV Moses Pike, transferred to Navy supervision for construction and was then transferred shortly after launch as Sagitta (AK-87) to the Army to become the Engineer Port Repair Ship Marvin Lyle Thomas. She was one of two such repair ships transferred to Navy in 1952 and served as the civilian crewed, unarmed USNS Sagitta (T-AK-87). The ship may have been unique among her type in being then transferred back to the Army in 1966.

Construction 

The ship was a Maritime Commission type N3-M-A1 cargo vessel hull (MC hull 650) assigned the name MV Moses Pike. The ship was transferred to Navy supervision for construction at the Penn-Jersey Shipbuilding Corporation,  Camden, New Jersey and renamed Sagitta. The ship was launched on 9 July 1944 sponsored by Mrs. Frank L. Hare.

Transfer to Army 
On 18 July 1944 the ship was transferred to the U.S. Army for conversion into the Engineer Port Repair Ship Marvin Lyle Thomas for operation by the U.S. Army Corps of Engineers rehabilitating war damaged ports.

Marvin Lyle Thomas was one of the two last ships converted and was operational too late to participate in the postwar port rehabilitation to a significant degree. Like her sister repair ship, Joe C. Specker (ex Vela (AK-89)), she remained operational with the Army until transferred to Navy's Military Sea Transportation Service (MSTS) in 1952.

MSTS Service Career 
Transferred from the Army to the Navy under assignment to the Military Sea Transportation Service on 26 April 1952, Sagitta operated as a summer DEW line resupply ship out of New York City from 1952 through 1959. She steamed annually to St. Johns and Argentia, Newfoundland; and to Goose Bay, Labrador. She also voyaged to Cartwright, Labrador, annually except in 1954; to Makkovick, Labrador, annually from 1957 through 1959; to Resolution Island, Northwest Territories, annually except in 1952 and 1957; and to Narsarsauk, Greenland, in June 1954 and 1957. During the winters, she carried cargo to Bermuda; San Juan, Puerto Rico; and Cristobal, Panama Canal Zone, annually from 1953 through 1955; and to Guantanamo Bay, Cuba, in 1956. Occasionally sailing across the Atlantic Ocean, she visited Piraeus, Greece, from 9 to 12 February 1957, and Port Lyautey, Morocco, from 2 to 6 February 1958.

Transfer Back to Army 
Transferred to the Maritime Administration on 23 February 1960, she remained in the National Defense Reserve Fleet until 25 April 1966 when she was transferred to the Army for duty as a training vessel, first at Fort Eustis, Virginia, then in about 1972 at Bayboro Harbor, St. Petersburg, Florida as USAV Resource and then at Curtis Bay, Maryland, where she provided stevedore training.

The vessel was scrapped in 1976.

Notes

References

External links 
 NavSource Online: Service Ship Photo Archive - USAT Marvin Lyle Thomas - USNS Sagitta T-AK-87

 

Enceladus-class cargo ships
Port repair ships of the United States Army
Ships built in Camden, New Jersey
1944 ships
Type N3 ships of the United States Army
World War II auxiliary ships of the United States